The 2009 World Modern Pentathlon Championship were held in London, UK from August 11 to August 14.

Medal summary

Men's events

Women's events

Medal table

See also
 World Modern Pentathlon Championship

References

 Sport123

External links
 Official website

Modern pentathlon in the United Kingdom
World Modern Pentathlon Championships
World Modern Pentathlon Championships
International sports competitions in London
World Modern Pentathlon Championships
Multisports in the United Kingdom